Ryan Jahnke (born March 21, 1978) is an American former competitive figure skater. He is the 2004 Skate America silver medalist and 2003 U.S. national bronze medalist.

Personal life 
Jahnke was born on March 21, 1978, in Detroit, Michigan. He studied pre-medicine on a four-year academic scholarship at Wayne State University before quitting due to his move to Colorado. He majored in finance and minored in information systems at the University of Colorado, graduating in December 2009. He is fluent in German.

Jahnke married Tashiana Foreman on June 1, 2002. Their son, Zayin Nicholas Jahnke, was born in November 2011.

Career 
Jahnke began skating in 1985 because his friends played ice hockey. He won the novice men's title at the 1993 U.S. Championships. Around 1995, he broke two teeth in a skating collision with Dan Hollander while training in St. Clair Shores, Michigan. He was awarded bronze medals competing on the junior level at the 1995 and 1996 U.S. Championships and placed 19th at the 1997 World Junior Championships in Seoul, South Korea.

After training in Michigan under Diana Ronayne, he relocated in 1999 to Colorado Springs, Colorado, where his coach had received a job offer. He placed fifth at the 2000 U.S. Championships. As a result, he was sent to his first senior ISU Championship, the 2000 Four Continents in Osaka, Japan, where he finished 12th.

Jahnke won the bronze medal at the 2003 U.S. Championships and placed 6th at the 2003 Four Continents in Beijing, China. He finished 13th at the 2003 Worlds in Washington, D.C., after ranking third in qualifying group B, 9th in the short program, and 18th in the free skate.

The following season, Jahnke placed fourth at the 2004 U.S. Championships and received a pewter medal. At the 2004 Four Continents in Hamilton, Ontario, Canada, he had the same final placement after ranking fifth in both segments.

Jahnke competed at multiple Grand Prix competitions. At the 2004 Skate America, he placed fourth in the short and first in the free skate, obtaining the silver medal behind Brian Joubert and ahead of Michael Weiss.

Jahnke retired from competitive skating after the 2006 U.S. Championships. He made his professional debut at the 2006 Brian Boitano Skating Spectacular and has also worked as a coach. In 2010, he launched his new website, Myskatingmall.com.

Programs

Competitive highlights

1999–2000 to 2005–2006

1991–1992 to 2004–2005

References

External links

 Myskatingmall.com

1978 births
Living people
American male single skaters
Figure skaters from Detroit